The Thunderbolt is a discontinued mechanical outdoor warning siren made by Federal Signal Corporation. It has a very recognizable design, being a unidirectional siren with a large yellow (or other color based on buyer's choice) exponential horn.

History
The Thunderbolt siren was developed between 1949 and 1952. It was the first "supercharged" siren, which uses a supercharger to force air into the rotor, greatly increasing the siren's volume. In the 1980's, when civil defense fell into disuse, thunderbolts across the United States were repurposed for nuclear, and storm warning siren systems. During the Gulf War, Federal sent a number of modified Thunderbolt 1003s to Kuwait to warn its citizens of an air raid. These were the system 7000 series and were only found in Kuwait. Later, Kuwait's sirens were all replaced with Federal Signal Modulators. One system 7000 is on display next to a Federal Signal Modulator at the Kuwait General Administration of Civil Defense. in Kuwait City, Kuwait. Eventually in 1990, the Thunderbolt was discontinued in favor of the new 2001 Siren Series. Since then many have sat abandoned or have been replaced by newer systems. In the 21st century, many communities lacking siren coverage have purchased Thunderbolts that once sat in various towns, and have been refurbished. Many Thunderbolts are also in private and legal possession.

Design
The Thunderbolt came in several models. The Model 1000 was single tone, while the Model 1000T and Model 1003 were dual tone. The Model 1003 also included two solenoid-operated control valves. They are used to create alternating steady, alternating wail, pulsed steady, and pulsed wail signals, which can be used as a fire warning. Otherwise, it is identical to the 1000T, but used the 5/6 rotor only. Although the 4/5 port rotor is compatible, it was never offered for the 1003. Only two 4/5 port rotor 1003's exist currently, one in Saint Paul, Nebraska, and the other in University Park, Illinois. The 1003 entered production in 1962, and ceased in 1990 (However, it has been recently been believed to enter production in '61). It is noteworthy that the 1003 was the last production unit ever built. The last sirens went to a township in Michigan, however all of them were removed and replaced around 2009. Originally the Thunderbolt used a motor and an Abart gear reducer driven by pulley to drive the large spur gear which makes the projector rotate. The pulleys utilized 3 different belt slots to change the RPM in which the siren rotates, from 2, 4, and 8 RPM. In 1980, Federal wanted to make the Thunderbolt more maintenance free, doing so by turning the motor and gear reducer to face each other and attached to make a direct drive system which rotated at 4 RPM. This rotator was used only on the B-series models. B-series units were only offered in 1980.

References

External links
 Thunderbolt siren manual
 Listen to a single tone Thunderbolt 1000 in alert mode.
 Listen to a dual tone Thunderbolt 1000T in alert mode.
 Listen to a dual tone Thunderbolt 1003 in Hi-Lo mode.
 Map of all Thunderbolt sirens still in existence

Sirens
Disaster preparedness
Civil defense
Emergency population warning systems